Sir Frederic William Lang (1852 – 5 March 1937) was a New Zealand politician, initially an independent conservative, then from 1914 a member of the Reform Party. He was the eighth Speaker of the House of Representatives, from 1913 to 1922.

Early life
Lang was born in Blackheath, Kent, England, in 1852. He emigrated to New Zealand as a young man and settled in Tuhikaramea near present-day Temple View. He played football and represented the Auckland Province. He never married.

Around 1906, he sold his farm and moved to Onehunga.

Political career

Lang's political career started with his election to the Tuhikaramea Road Board. He was elected onto the Waipa County and became its chairman. He also belonged to the Waikato Charitable Aid Board.

He was Chairman of Committees from 1912 to 1913. He then became Speaker of the House of Representatives from 1913 to 1922.

In 1913 as speaker, in response to filibusting by Āpirana Ngata, Lang introduced a rule that MPs who could speak in English must not speak te reo Māori and by 1920 Parliament no longer employed translators. The situation was reversed in the 1980s with the Māori Renaissance and the Maori Language Act 1987.

He was knighted in 1916. He was appointed to the Legislative Council in 1924 and served for one term until 1931. In 1935, he was awarded the King George V Silver Jubilee Medal.

Death
He died at his home in Onehunga on 5 March 1937.

Notes

References

|-

|-

|-

English emigrants to New Zealand
New Zealand Knights Bachelor
Reform Party (New Zealand) MPs
People from Blackheath, London
Speakers of the New Zealand House of Representatives
Members of the New Zealand Legislative Council
1852 births
1937 deaths
Reform Party (New Zealand) MLCs
Members of the New Zealand House of Representatives
Unsuccessful candidates in the 1905 New Zealand general election
Unsuccessful candidates in the 1922 New Zealand general election
New Zealand MPs for Auckland electorates
New Zealand MPs for North Island electorates
19th-century New Zealand politicians
New Zealand politicians awarded knighthoods